Coolgreany is a village located in north County Wexford in Ireland, in the shadow of Croghan Mountain, overlooking Tara Hill in the extreme north of County Wexford.

The village is located about 3  km from the N11 Dublin-Wexford road at Inch. Amenities include a Gaelic Athletic Association pitch, handball alley, a grocery store, two pubs (public houses) and national (primary) school. The primary school opened in the early 1980s.

Nearby major towns are Arklow and Gorey. 

Historically the village is known for the evictions of 1887.

See also
 List of towns and villages in Ireland

References

External links
 Coolgreany Evictions Photo Album
 National Library of Ireland Catalogue : Album of photographs of the Coolgreany Evictions, Wexford, 1887

Towns and villages in County Wexford